Mitchum is a surname. Notable people with the surname include:

 Bentley Mitchum (born 1967), American actor and grandson of Robert Mitchum
 Christopher Mitchum (born 1943), American actor and 2nd son of Robert Mitchum
 James Mitchum (born 1941), American actor and eldest son of Robert Mitchum
 John Mitchum (1919–2001), American actor and younger brother of Robert Mitchum
 Julie Mitchum (1914–2003), American actress and elder sister of Robert Mitchum
 Junie Mitchum (born 1973), West Indian cricketer
 Robert Mitchum (1917–1997), American actor
 Timothy Mitchum (born 1992), American actor and singer

See also
 Mitchum, a brand of deodorant
 Mitcham (disambiguation)